The Directive 2001/19/EC of the European Parliament and of the Council of 14 May 2001 controls the general system for the recognition of professional qualifications of nurses responsible for general care, dental practitioners, veterinary surgeons, midwives, architects, pharmacists and doctors in the European Union.  

The Directive 2001/19/EC amends Council Directives 89/48/EC and 92/51/EC on the general system for the recognition of professional qualifications and Council Directives 77/452/EC, 77/453/EC, 78/686/EC, 78/697/EC, 78/1026/EC, 80/154/EC, 80/155/EC, 85/384/EC, 85/432, 85/433/EC and 93/16/EC concerning the above-mentioned professions.

The general system Directives permit the host Member State to require, subject to certain conditions, to take compensation steps, notably where substantial differences exist between the theoretical and/or practical education and training undergone and that covered by the qualification required in the host Member State.

The Directive 2001/19/EC is published on the Official Journal of the European Communities L 205, 31.07.2001.

External links

Text of the directive in the Official Journal of the European Union
The EU

2001 19
2001 in law
2001 in the European Union